Kokand 1912 (Uzbek: Qoʻqon 1912 futbol klubi / "Қўқон 1912" футбол клуби) is an Uzbekistani football club from the city of Kokand. Founded in 1912, it is the oldest football club of Uzbekistan and Central Asia. It plays in the Uzbekistan Super League.

History
For the first time football entered the territory of modern Uzbekistan at the beginning of the 20th century. For the first time the soldiers of the Russian Empire began to play football in their free time, which were based in various cities of Central Asia, and the region of Central Asia was part of the Russian Empire as Russian Turkestan.

The inhabitants of the surrounding military fortifications of the Russian Empire, cities, and villages have expressed an interest to a new sport. Matches between soldiers watched a large number of onlookers. Special popularity of football is starting to happen among the local youth. The real goals at that time was only for soldiers. Gradually they began to imitate the playing fields as soldiers, and were able to make a homemade ball. The first ball for them was created by a local shoemaker, who used leather for the material, and inside the ball was stuffed with different fabrics. Shortly afterwards a few locals gathering together the necessary money, bought the Russian soldiers real ball. After the residents had a real ball, the popularity of football has grown even more.

In 1912, in Kokand formed the first football team consisting of local residents. It was the first football team in the history of Central Asia and Uzbekistan. First, this team plays matches with each other, and then begins to play with the teams of Russian soldiers. Gradually Kokand team is beginning to win team Russian soldiers, and sometimes with big bills. Soon after the success, opponent becomes a team of Kokand Ferghana military garrison. Match in Skobelev (now Ferghana) extends until in favor of team military of the garrison with minimal-sum game. After defeat, Kokand offer to play a return match, and a month later the match between the teams is repeated. The return match took place in Kokand, and ended with the victory of the Kokand team with a minimum score. A distinctive feature of this match was that the match was watched by a large number of spectators.

Soon after a series of successes Kokand team, in football are beginning to pay attention intelligentsia and wealthy people and merchants not only Kokand, but and the entire Ferghana Valley. Thanks to their efforts in the same 1912 created the first in the history of Central Asia and Uzbekistan's football team called "Muskomanda" (Muslim team). Later in the other cities and villages of the Ferghana Valley to create the local team. "Muskomanda" plays matches with these teams, making a sort of tour of the towns and villages of the Ferghana Valley.

Further development 
The playing field for local enthusiasts set up without problems and the main problem be the balls and appropriate shoes. The problem with the balls decided by the members of the "Muskomanda" – brother Ruzimat and Ismail Niyazov's, who by profession was a shoemaker. They set up the production of homemade balls. Due to the high demand of balls among the teams of a large region, the brothers decide to expand production, and at the same time expand their workshop. The brothers, together with their employees, establish the production of not only balls, but also homemade shoes for football. After some time, the balls produced in Kokand are widely known throughout Central Asia, and even abroad. To brothers comes surprise made to order from Central Russia, and they send there ordered 400 (four hundred) balls.

The most famous players "Muskomanda" in 1910s were brothers Ruzimat and Ismail Niyazov's, Hasanjan Muhiddinov, brothers Akhunjan, Akbarjan and Muminjan Baymatov's. In the 1920s and in 1930s the main players "Muskomanda" was the work of the Kokand plant for the production of oil. Some of the most famous players of the period: M. Akhmedov, M. Abdullayev, A. Mukhiddinov, K. Muhiddinov, R. Niyazov, M. Baymatov, O. Baymatov, W. Shahniyazov, B. Usarov, M. Soliev, P. Haydarov.

USSR period 
After the formation of the USSR (Soviet Union) and the establishment of the country's atheist ideology, the club is deprived of the name Muskomanda, and begins to be called simply Kokand. In 1926 in Uzbekistan the Uzbekistan SSR Championship on football begins carrying out, and till 1936 tournament is called the Championship of the cities of the Uzbekistan SSR. In this tournament, the Kokand team does not achieve much success, and the Champions are mainly the teams of Tashkent, and once the team of the city of Ferghana. Since 1937, the Championship of the cities of the Uzbekistan SSR is transformed into the Yzbekistan SSR Championship, and in that season Kokand becomes vice-champion. In the 1930s of football in Uzbekistan is experiencing unprecedented since the birth of rise. It was in those years that the Uzbekistan SSR football team was created, the basis of which was formed by Kokand players, along with the players of Tashkent teams.

In 1950-e years the club Kokand club is experiencing a small downturn. The club receives the name of Mehnat (Work in translation from Uzbek language), mainly involved in the Uzbekistan SSR Championship. In 1958, the construction of the stadium Komsomol, designed for five thousand spectators, was completed in Kokand. In those years, the city formed a few more football teams, each of which consists of working different companies. These clubs become a kind of farm clubs of Mehnat, and the most talented players of these teams receive invitations from the main team of the city – Mehnat.

In 1968, Mehnat debuted in Class B of the USSR Championship Second League, and at the end of the season ranked 19th among 22 teams in the zone Central Asia. The following season, in 1969, Mehnat at the end of the season is on the 14th place among 24 teams in the area of Central Asia of class B of the Second League. From 1970 to 1987, Mehnat participated in the regional championship, and later in the Uzbekistan SSR Championship. In 1987, Mehnat for the first time and for the last time in its history becomes the winner of the Uzbekistan SSR Championship. Kokand at the same time the club also participates in the Uzbekistan SSR Cup, but the winner of this tournament never becomes.

In 1988, the club changes name to Avtomobilist (Motorist in translation from Russian language), and with that year begins the USSR Second League. At the end of the season, Avtomobilist ranks 13th among 19 teams in the seventh zone. In 1989, an Avtomobilist at the end of the season suddenly takes the 5th place among the 21 teams in the seventh zone of the Second League of the USSR. In the seasons 1990 and 1991 Avtomobilist is also involved in the Second League of the Soviet Union and the end of the seasons occupies the 7th and 14th places respectively.

Part of the team at the end of 1980s, during the participation of the club in the Second League of the USSR: the head coach — the Nerd Ayriev, players — Igor Usov, Aydinbek Aliyev, Igor Polishchuk, Sergei Calistru, Jamoliddin Tojiboev, Edvard Kudryashov, Dilshod Muminov, Alexander Golokolosov, Elvedin Ayupov, Nail Sagitov, Igor Golovanov, Damir Rakhmatullin, Zahid Nurmatov, Rustam Urazov, Numon Khasanov, Vitaly Avanesov, Andrei Timofeev, Vyacheslav Dervishev, Alexander Starikov, Yevgeny Matveyev, Michael Enns, Murad Qamchiev, Rustam Abdullaev, Andrei Yemanov, Murad Ismoilov, Alfred Dietrich, André Fedorov, Rodion Shamanaev.

Uzbekistan 
After the dissolution of the USSR and the independence of Uzbekistan, since 1992 was held the national championship of the country – Uzbekistan Championship. In that year the club changed its name to Temiryulchi (Railroader in translation from Uzbek language). Temiryulchi was included in the Uzbekistan Higher League, and thus became one of the participants of the first draw of Uzbekistan Higher League. According to the results of the debut season, Kokand club took sixth place among seventeen teams. In that year, Temiryulchi also reached the final of the first draw of the Uzbekistan Cup, Namangan lost Navbahor with the score 6:5 on penalties (main and extra time ended in a draw with the score 0:0). That year Kokand club for the first time, and for the last time in its history reached the final of the Uzbekistan Cup. This is considered the best achievement of the club in the new period, during the independence of Uzbekistan.

Temiryulchi prior to 1995, participated in the Uzbekistan Higher League. In the season of 1995, finishing in the penultimate 15th place, relegated to the Uzbekistan First League. In the First League was delayed for two seasons, and in the season 1997, becoming the winner of this League, has returned to the Higher League. Until 2000 Kokand club participated in the Higher League. In the 2000 season taking the last 20-th place for the second time in its history, relegated to the First League.

In 2001, he again won the First League and returned to the Higher League. In 2002, the club changed its name to Kokand. In the seasons 2002 and 2003 participated in the Higher League, and in 2004, was not allowed to participate in the Higher League for non-payment of premium. In 2005 and 2006 participated in the First League, and in 2007 even participated in the Second League. The next two seasons again was a participant in the First League. In 2009, the club changed its name to Bunyodkor-Kokand. In 2010–2011, the club actually ceased to exist.

In 2012, the club was revived with the name Kokand 1912, and until 2014 participated in the First League. In 2014, having won the second place in the First League, I got the opportunity to participate in the Higher League again. Up to the present time participant of this League.

Name changes

Domestic history

Current squad

Honours
 Uzbekistan First League (3): 1997, 2001, 2009

Managers
 Tokhir Kapadze (2013–14)
 Rustam Abdullaev (2014– November 2015)
 Vadim Shodimatov (interim) (November 2015– 6 December 2015)
 Murod Ismoilov (7 December 2015– 16 May 2016)
 Sergey Kovshov (16 May 2016– 11 June 2016)
 Numon Khasanov (11 June 2016– )

References

External links
 Kokand 1912 Official Website
 Kokand 1912 Matches and results at soccerway.com

Football clubs in Uzbekistan
1912 establishments in the Russian Empire
Association football clubs established in 1912